Megan Maxwell was the pseudonym of María del Carmen Rodríguez del Álamo Lázaro (born 1965 in Nuremberg, Germany), a Spanish romantic novelist whose works can be categorized as chick lit. She has an American father and a Spanish mother. She has lived with her mother in Spain since she was still a baby. Since 2009, she has written several novels.

References

External links
Megan Maxwell's website

Spanish women novelists
Living people
1965 births
21st-century Spanish women writers
Spanish romantic fiction writers